Z9 may refer to:
 Motorola Z9, a cell phone model
 Aero Zambia IATA code
 BlueAnt Z9, a Bluetooth Headset
 BMW Z9, a concept car by BMW
 German destroyer Z9 Wolfgang Zenker
 Galindo Mellado Cruz
 Harbin Z-9, a military Chinese aircraft
 IBM System z9, a mainframe
 Nikon Z 9, a full-frame mirrorless camera produced by Nikon
 Zbrojovka Z9, a Czechoslovak car of the 1930s